Jerome Jean-Marie Felton (born July 3, 1986) is a former American football fullback. He previously played for the Minnesota Vikings, where he had been a fundamental part of Adrian Peterson's success, including Peterson's 2,097 rushing yards season in 2012. He played college football at Furman, and was drafted by the Detroit Lions in the fifth round of the 2008 NFL Draft. He has also played for the Carolina Panthers, Indianapolis Colts, and Buffalo Bills.

Early years
Felton is a 2004 graduate of Sequoyah High School, Madisonville, Tennessee, where he was a two-way starter at fullback and middle linebacker. He rushed for over 3,000 yards and compiled over 300 tackles in his three-year career. He was a three-time team offensive MVP, All-County, and All-Region selection, served as team captain, rushed for 1,300 yards, and finished second on his team with 104 tackles in 2003.

College career
Felton was all-conference as a senior, in 2007, and closed out his career as Furman's all-time record holder in scoring with 414 points. In 2006, he was named first-team All-SoCon and helped lead Furman to an 8–4 record, earn a playoff berth, and finish ranked No. 12 in The Sports Network national poll. In 2005, he helped Paladins to an 11–3 record, NCAA I-AA semifinal playoff finish, and No. 3 final national ranking. He led in rushing with 940 yards and scored a team leading 20 touchdowns and set a school single season scoring record with 124 points. In 2004, he began the season in a reserve role but by midseason took over the starting fullback job, beating out a pair of seniors in the process.

Professional career

Detroit Lions
He was drafted by the Lions in the fifth round of the 2008 NFL Draft. He became the Lions starting fullback as a rookie, playing in 13 games, starting six and catching nine passes. On August 30, 2011, he was waived by the team.

Carolina Panthers
Felton was claimed off waivers by the Carolina Panthers on September 1, 2011. After the Panthers waived Tony Fiammetta, Felton was named starting fullback of the Panthers, just three days after being claimed off waivers. Felton was waived by the Panthers on November 25.

Indianapolis Colts
Felton was claimed off waivers by the Indianapolis Colts on November 28, 2011.

Minnesota Vikings
On March 20, 2012, Felton was signed as a free agent by the Minnesota Vikings. On December 26, 2012, Felton was selected to his first NFL Pro Bowl.
On March 12, 2013, Felton was re-signed by the Vikings with a three-year, $7.5 million contract. On August 14, 2013, Felton underwent an appendectomy. On August 26, 2013, Felton was suspended for three games for violating the NFL's substance-abuse policy.

Buffalo Bills
On March 11, 2015, Felton signed with the Buffalo Bills. He was released on September 2, 2016, as part of final preseason roster cuts. On September 12, 2016, he re-signed with the Bills.

On December 15, 2017, Felton announced his retirement from the NFL.

NFL statistics

References

External links
Detroit Lions bio 
Furman Paladins bio 

1986 births
Living people
People from Madisonville, Tennessee
Players of American football from Tennessee
African-American players of American football
American football fullbacks
Furman Paladins football players
Detroit Lions players
Carolina Panthers players
Indianapolis Colts players
Minnesota Vikings players
Buffalo Bills players
National Conference Pro Bowl players
People from Düren
Sportspeople from Cologne (region)
21st-century African-American sportspeople
20th-century African-American people